Aurel Vainer (10 January 1932 – 31 October 2021) was a Romanian economist and politician. He was a leader of the Romanian Jewish community, and also the vice president of the Romanian Chamber of Commerce.

Vainer was elected leader of the Jewish community in 2005. He retired in November 2020, after 15 years.

References

1932 births
2021 deaths
Jewish Romanian politicians
Moldavian Jews
Romanian economists
Members of the Chamber of Deputies (Romania)
Romanian politicians of ethnic minority parties
People from Ștefănești, Botoșani